Harold Danko (born June 13, 1947 in Ohio) is an American jazz pianist.

Danko attended Youngstown State University. Among his credits are work in the big bands of Woody Herman and Thad Jones/Mel Lewis, as well as smaller ensembles with Gerry Mulligan, Chet Baker and Lee Konitz. He worked often with Rich Perry in the 1990s and also played with Rufus Reid, Kirk Lightsey, Jeff Hirshfield, Edward Simon, and Gregory Herbert.

Discography

As leader

Main source:

As sideman
With Chet Baker
Once Upon a Summertime (Artists House, 1977 [1980])
As Time Goes By (Timeless, 1986)
Cool Cat (Timeless, 1986 [1989])
Memories - Chet Baker in Tokyo (King Records, 1988)
With Thad Jones and Mel Lewis
The Thad Jones Mel Lewis Quartet (Artists House, 1978)
With Lee Konitz
Yes, Yes, Nonet (SteepleChase, 1979)
Dovetail (Sunnyside, 1983)
Ideal Scene (Soul Note, 1986)
The New York Album (Soul Note, 1988)
Dearly Beloved (SteepleChase, 1996)
RichLee! (SteepleChase, 1997) with Rich Perry

'With  & Pat Morrissey Souvenir (mja Records, 1999)

References

1947 births
Living people
American jazz pianists
American male pianists
SteepleChase Records artists
Inner City Records artists
People from Sharon, Pennsylvania
20th-century American pianists
Jazz musicians from Pennsylvania
21st-century American pianists
20th-century American male musicians
21st-century American male musicians
American male jazz musicians
Sunnyside Records artists